Malaysia has competed at every of the ASEAN Para Games which was first held in Kuala Lumpur, Malaysia in 2001 ASEAN Para Games.

Medal tables
*Red border color indicates tournament was held on home soil.

Medals by Games

See also
 Malaysia at the Paralympics
 Malaysia at the Asian Para Games
 Malaysia at the Southeast Asian Games

References

Malaysia
ASEAN Para Games
ASEAN Para Games